If You Have Ghosts may refer to:
 "If You Have Ghosts", a song by Roky Erickson from his 1981 album The Evil One
 "If You Have Ghosts" (True Detective), an episode of the American television series True Detective

See also
 If You Have Ghost, an EP by the Swedish band Ghost